

Margravine of the Nordmark, 965–1157

Margravine of Brandenburg, 1157–1356

Electress of Brandenburg, 1356–1806

Margravine of Brandenburg-Ansbach, 1398–1791

Margravine of Brandenburg-Kulmbach, 1398–1604

Margravine of Brandenburg-Bayreuth, 1604–1791

Margravine of Brandenburg-Bayreuth-Kulmbach, 1655–1726

Margravine of Brandenburg-Küstrin, 1535–1571

Margravine of Brandenburg-Schwedt, 1688–1788

Sources
BRANDENBURG

See also
List of Prussian consorts
List of German queens
Princess of Orange
Princess of Neuchâtel
Duchess of Saxe-Lauenburg
Grand Duchess of Posen
List of consorts of Hohenzollern

Brandenburg, List of consorts of